The Durban International Film Festival  (DIFF) is an annual film festival that takes place in Durban, KwaZulu-Natal province, South Africa. Founded in 1979 by Teddy Sarkin and Ros Sarkin, it is the oldest and largest film festival in Africa and presents over 200 screenings celebrating the best in South African, African and international cinema. Most of the screenings are either African or South African premieres. The festival also offers filmmaker workshops, industry seminars, discussion forums, and outreach activities that include screenings in township areas where cinemas are non-existent, and much more including Talent Campus Durban and a Durban FilmMart co-production market.

The festival offers many competition sections and some of the prizes have cash attached. Since 2006, Amnesty International via the Durban Amnesty group, has also sponsored a cash prize called the Amnesty International Durban Human Rights Award.

Since 2005 DIFF serves as the South African launch for the Wavescape Surf Film Festival.

Talent Campus Durban, in cooperation with the Berlinale Talent Campus, was a new initiative in 2008. and ran its fifth edition in 2012.

Durban FilmMart, a co-production finance forum, launched in 2010. It is run in partnership with the City of Durban's Durban Film Office.

External links
 Durban International Film Festival

Festivals in Durban
Film festivals in South Africa
Film festivals established in 1979